The Pleasure Seekers may refer to:

 The Pleasure Seekers (1920 film), a 1920 American film directed by George Archainbaud
 The Pleasure Seekers (1964 film), a 1964 American film based on the novel Coins in the Fountain
 The Pleasure Seekers (band), a 1960s-era, all-female garage rock band from Detroit, Michigan.
 The Pleasure Seekers (album), an album by American band The System
 "The Pleasure Seekers" (song), a song from the album.